Ortacalar (also: Ortaköy, Laz language: Ç'arnavat'i) is a village in the Arhavi District, Artvin Province, Turkey. Its population is 92 (2021).

References

Villages in Arhavi District
Laz settlements in Turkey